Renaissance Capital Bank was a financial institution based in Kyiv, the capital of Ukraine.

History 
Renaissance Capital was established in 2004 in Kyiv, the capital of Ukraine.  In 2009, the Bank established presence in Belarus and was expanding its business to a wider Central and Eastern European region.

The controlling shareholder of Renaissance Capital is SCM Finance which is 100% owned by SCM Group. 100% of SCM shares belong to Rinat Akhmetov, well-known Ukrainian businessman and patron.

On March 11, 2011, the transaction on purchasing 100% of Renaissance Capital Bank, a part of Renaissance Group, has been closed by SCM Group as the Purchaser and Renaissance Group as the Vendor. First Ukrainian International Bank (FUIB) has acted as a financial adviser to SCM Group delivering full range of advisory services supporting the transaction from its launch until closing.

Membership 
 First Stock Trading System Association (PFTS)
 Professional Association of Registrars and Depositaries (PARD)
 Ukrainian Exchange (UX).

Products 
Renaissance Credit provides banking services in Ukraine as trademark of Renaissance Capital Bank (NBU licence No.222 dated 30.09.2009). , the bank team includes 1,465 employees.

References

External links 
 System Capital Management official website
 Renaissance Credit
 PFTS Stock Exchange
 Ukrainian Exchange

SCM Holdings
Defunct banks of Ukraine